The Airport Connector is a  freeway in the Harrisburg, Pennsylvania, area in the Commonwealth of Pennsylvania. It begins at Harrisburg International Airport and runs north to Pennsylvania Route 283 (PA 283). There is one intermediate interchange with PA 230.

The highway is one of only two freeways in Pennsylvania with no posted route number (the other being the President Biden Expressway). In the Location Referencing System, it is designated State Route 3032 by the Pennsylvania Department of Transportation. In 2021, the freeway gained the name Airport Road.

Route description

The Airport Connector begins at the entrance to Harrisburg International Airport in Lower Swatara Township, Dauphin County, where the roadway continues south to loop around the terminal. Past the airport, the road passes over Norfolk Southern's Royalton Branch and Amtrak's Keystone Corridor railroad lines before immediately reaching a partial cloverleaf interchange with PA 230. From this point, the four-lane freeway heads north-northeast through wooded areas adjacent to homes and farms, crossing over the Pennsylvania Turnpike (I-76) without an interchange as it curves north-northwest. The freeway passes more areas of farms and woods before it reaches its terminus at a trumpet interchange with PA 283. The interchange also provides partial access between PA 283 and PA 441, but the Airport Connector has no connection to the latter route.

History
With the opening of PA 283 in 1972 and the completion of new terminals at Harrisburg International Airport the following year, a need was determined to provide a direct connection between the two, as the airport was not served by the area's freeway system. Construction began in 1974 and the connector opened to traffic in 1977.

Exit list

See also

References

External links

Roads in the Harrisburg, Pennsylvania area
Limited-access roads in Pennsylvania
Freeways in the United States